Benjamin Lavernhe (born 14 August 1984) is a French actor. He has appeared in more than sixteen films since 2009.

Filmography

References

External links 

Living people
French male film actors
21st-century French male actors
1984 births